Chalcone 4'-O-glucosyltransferase (4'CGT) is an enzyme with systematic name UDP-alpha-D-glucose:2',4,4',6'-tetrahydroxychalcone 4'-O-beta-D-glucosyltransferase. This enzyme catalyses the following chemical reaction

 (1) UDP-alpha-D-glucose + 2',4,4',6'-tetrahydroxychalcone  UDP + 2',4,4',6'-tetrahydroxychalcone 4'-O-beta-D-glucoside
 (2) UDP-alpha-D-glucose + 2',3,4,4',6'-pentahydroxychalcone  UDP + 2',3,4,4',6'-pentahydroxychalcone 4'-O-beta-D-glucoside

This enzyme is isolated from the plant Antirrhinum majus (snapdragon).

References

External links 

EC 2.4.1